This is a list of organizations and associated posts which are related to food safety, either as a primary interest or through statutory responsibility.  National organizations are grouped by the UN geoscheme.

Africa

 Africa Food Safety Forum (AFSF)

 African Food Safety Network (AFoSaN)
 The Food Safety and Quality Authority of The Gambia (FSQA)

 Tanzanian Food and Drugs Authority (TFDA)
 Ethiopian Food and Drug Authority (EFDA)
 Moroccan National Office of Food Safety (ONSSA)
 South African National Regulator for Compulsory Specifications (NRCS)

 Egyptian Food Safety Authority
 Ghana Food and Drugs Authority
  National Agency for Food and Drug Administration and Control
Nigerian Food and Drugs Authority
National Agency For Food And Drug Administration and Control 
[Kaduna State Livestock Regulatory Authority] [www.kadlra.kdsg.gov.ng]

Americas

 Argentina
 Minister of Economy
 Secretariat of Agriculture, Livestock, Fishing and Food
 National Food Safety and Quality Service (SENASA) Servicio Nacional de Sanidad y Calidad Agroalimentaria
 Canada
 Minister of Agriculture
 Agriculture and Agri-Food Canada (AAFC)
 Canadian Food Inspection Agency (CFIA)
 Minister of Health
 Health Canada
 Health Products and Food Branch
 Guelph Food Technology Centre (Canada)
 United States of America
 U.S. Food and Drug Administration (FDA)
 Center for Food Safety and Applied Nutrition (CFSAN)
 International Food Protection Training Institute (IFPTI)
 Joint Expert Committee on Food Additives (JECFA)
 United States Department of Agriculture (USDA)
 Under Secretary for Food Safety
 Food Safety and Inspection Service (FSIS)

Asia
 Saudi Arabia 
 Saudi Food and Drug Authority
 Bangladesh
 Bangladesh Food Safety Authority (BFSA)
 Burma
 Food and Druhg Administration (Burma)
 China
 General Administration of Quality Supervision, Inspection and Quarantine
 State Food and Drug Administration
 Hong Kong SAR
 Centre for Food Safety
 India
 Food Safety and Standards Authority of India
 Indonesia
 National Agency of Drug and Food Control of Indonesia
 Nepal
 Department of Food Technology and Quality Control
Philippines
Food and Drug Administration (Philippines)
 South Korea
 Ministry of Food and Drug Safety (MFDS)
 Minister for Health, Welfare and Family Affairs
 Ministry for Health, Welfare and Family Affairs
 Office for Healthcare Policy
 Taiwan
Ministry of Health and Welfare (MHW)
 Food and Drug Administration (TFDA)
 Malaysia
Ministry of Health (MOH)
 Food Safety and Quality Division (FSQD)
Kazakhstan
Islamic Organisation for Food Security

Europe

 Multinational
 European Union
 Committee on the Environment, Public Health and Food Safety (EU)
 European Food Safety Authority
 SAFE FOODS
 Food Safety Promotion Board
 Belgium
 Federal Agency for the Safety of the Food Chain
 Greece
 Hellenic Food Authority
 Germany
 Federal Ministry of Food, Agriculture and Consumer Protection
 Federal Institute for Risk Assessment (BfR) Bundesinstitut für Risikobewertung
 Federal Office of Consumer Protection and Food Safety Bundesamt für Verbraucherschutz und Lebensmittelsicherheit
 Bundesanstalt für Landwirtschaft und Ernährung
 Netherlands
 Ministry of Economic Affairs, Agriculture and Innovation (ELI)
 nieuwe Voedsel en Waren Autoriteit (nVWA)
 Rijks Kwaliteitsinstituut voor Land- en Tuinbouwproducten (RiKILT)
 Rijksinstituut voor Volksgezondheid en Milieu (RiVM)
 Stichting Voedingscentrum Nederland
 Norway
 Minister of Agriculture and Food
 Norwegian Ministry of Agriculture and Food Landbruks- og matdepartementet
 Norwegian Food Safety Authority Mattilsynet
 Portugal
 Ministry of Economy
 Economic and Food Safety Authority Autoridade de Segurança Alimentar e Económica, ASAE
 Spain
 Ministerio de Sanidad, Consumo y Bienestar Social, Gobierno de España
 Agencia Española de Seguridad Alimentaria y Nutrición (AESAN)
 United Kingdom
 Department for Environment, Food and Rural Affairs
 Animal Health
 Pesticides Safety Directorate
 UK Government Decontamination Service
 Veterinary Medicines Directorate
 Food Standards Agency
 British Retail Consortium (BRC) Global Standard (Baines, R. (2010) Quality and Safety Standards in Food Supply Chains, Royal Agricultural University, UK)
 Advisory committee on the microbiological safety of food
 Food Standards Scotland

Oceania

 Multinational
 Food Standards Australia New Zealand (FSANZ)
 Australia
Minister for Agriculture, Drought and Emergency Management
Department of Agriculture, Water and the Environment
 Government of New South Wales
 Minister for Primary Industries (NSW)
 New South Wales Food Authority
 New Zealand
 Minister for Food Safety
 New Zealand Food Safety Authority (NZFSA)

See also 

 Institute of Food and Agricultural Sciences
 Institute of Food Technologists
 International Association for Food Protection
 International Food Information Council
 International Life Sciences Institute
 Food Administration

References

Food safety
Product testing